The 2008–09 season of the Turkish Women's First Football League is the 13th season of Turkey's premier women's football league. Trabzonspor is the champion of the season.

Season

Table

Results

External links
 Kadınlar 1. Ligi 2008 - 2009 Sezonu 

2008
2008–09 domestic women's association football leagues
Women's